Judas and the Black Messiah is a 2021 biographical crime drama film about the betrayal of Fred Hampton (played by Daniel Kaluuya), chairman of the Illinois chapter of the Black Panther Party in late-1960s Chicago, by William O'Neal (played by LaKeith Stanfield), an FBI informant. Jesse Plemons, Dominique Fishback, Ashton Sanders, Darrell Britt-Gibson, Lil Rel Howery, Algee Smith, Dominique Thorne, and Martin Sheen also star. The film is directed and produced by Shaka King, who wrote the screenplay with Will Berson, based on a story by the pair and Kenny and Keith Lucas.

A Fred Hampton biopic had been in the works for several years, with both the Lucas brothers and Will Berson writing and shopping screenplays individually since 2014. Berson's version almost got made with F. Gary Gray directing, but, when that fell through, King was hired to direct. The cast joined in 2019, with the blessings of Hampton's family, with filming beginning that fall in Ohio.

Judas and the Black Messiah premiered at the 2021 Sundance Film Festival on February 1, 2021, and was released in the United States by Warner Bros. Pictures on February 12, simultaneously in theaters and digitally on HBO Max. The film was lauded by critics, who praised King's direction, the cinematography, the screenplay, the performances (particularly Kaluuya's and Stanfield's), and its timely themes. The film earned six Oscar nominations at the 93rd Academy Awards, including Best Picture and Best Supporting Actor for both Kaluuya and Stanfield, and won Best Supporting Actor for Kaluuya and Best Original Song ("Fight for You"). For his performance, Kaluuya also won Best Supporting Actor at the Golden Globes, Critics' Choice Awards, Screen Actors Guild Awards, and BAFTA Awards.

Released in the midst of the COVID-19 pandemic, the film grossed $7 million worldwide against a budget of $26 million.

Plot 
In 1968, 19-year-old petty criminal William O'Neal is arrested in Chicago after attempting to steal a car while posing as a federal officer. He is approached by FBI Special Agent Roy Mitchell, who offers to have O'Neal's charges dropped if he works undercover for the bureau. O'Neal is assigned to infiltrate the Illinois chapter of the Black Panther Party (BPP) and its leader, Fred Hampton.

O'Neal begins to grow close to Hampton, who works to form alliances with rival gangs and militia bands while extending community outreach through the BPP's Free Breakfast for Children Program. Hampton's persuasive oratory skills eventually help to form the multiracial Rainbow Coalition along with the Young Lords and Young Patriots Organization. Hampton also falls in love with Deborah Johnson, a fellow BPP member. O'Neal begins to relay intel to Mitchell, who in return compensates him with money.

After Hampton is arrested and imprisoned for allegedly stealing $71 worth of ice cream bars, O'Neal begins to rise through the ranks and is promoted to security captain. When a shootout between the Chicago Police and the BPP occurs at the chapter office, O'Neal sneaks out as the police bomb the office. Outraged that he could have been killed himself, O'Neal attempts to quit being an informant but Mitchell refuses.

Three months later, Hampton is released from prison while appealing his charges and he reunites with Deborah, now pregnant with his child. BPP member Jimmy Palmer, who was hospitalized with non-life-threatening injuries after being shot by a police officer, dies unexpectedly while being transferred to another hospital. Assuming police have murdered Jimmy, fellow member Jake Winters engages in a shootout with police, killing several officers before being gunned down himself.

After Hampton's appeal is rejected, FBI Director J. Edgar Hoover orders Hampton be "neutralized" before he returns to prison. Mitchell corners O'Neal into helping with the plan by warning him that the BPP will retaliate against him if they find out he's an informant, and O'Neal reluctantly agrees to help. O'Neal is later handed a vial of sedatives and ordered to drug Hampton's drink with it by another undercover FBI collaborator, who hands O'Neal his old fake FBI badge. The next evening, BPP members gather at Hampton's apartment before he must depart for prison. An allied gang leader offers Hampton money to flee the country, but he turns it down and instead orders a trust to be established with the money under Jake's name. As the evening progresses, O'Neal reluctantly drugs Hampton's drink and departs soon after. Hours later, officers and agents raid the apartment and assassinate Hampton after shooting or injuring the other Black Panthers, while Deborah is arrested. Later, O'Neal meets with Mitchell, who gives him money and a pair of keys to a gas station he now owns. O'Neal attempts to quit again but reluctantly accepts the money and keys and puts them in his pocket.

Archive footage is shown of Hampton's speeches, including his funeral procession, and an interview O'Neal gave in 1989. The title cards state that O'Neal continued to work as an informant within the BPP before committing suicide in 1990. A lawsuit was filed against the FBI in 1970 and 12 years later was settled for $1.85 million. As of the film's release, Fred Hampton Jr. and his mother serve as chairman and board member of the Black Panther Party Cubs.

Cast 

In addition, Nicholas Velez portrays José Cha Cha Jiménez, founder of the Young Lords group, while Terayle Hill plays Black Panthers chairman George Sams, who is depicted as an FBI informant.

Production

Development 

Kenny and Keith Lucas began pitching the idea of a Fred Hampton biopic to A24 and Netflix in 2014, selling it as "The Conformist meets The Departed." While working with Shaka King on a television pilot in 2016, they pitched their idea for a Hampton film, and he became intrigued. Will Berson had also written a Hampton screenplay about the same time and it was in early stages of production, with F. Gary Gray in talks to direct, Casey Affleck and John Powers Middleton in negotiations to produce, and Jaden Smith and O'Shea Jackson Jr. being eyed to portray Hampton. After that version fell through, Berson and King rewrote his script with help from the Lucas brothers.

The brothers got in touch with Macro's Charles King, who agreed to finance half of the project.

Casting 
In February 2019, it was announced Daniel Kaluuya and LaKeith Stanfield had joined the cast of the film, with Ryan Coogler producing and Warner Bros. Pictures distributing. The film marks the second collaboration between Kaluuya and Stanfield, following the 2017 film Get Out. King, Kaluuya, and producer Charles D. King (who provided half the film's $26 million budget) reached out to Hampton's widow Akua Njeri and her son, Fred Hampton Jr., to get their blessing on the film and casting. In September 2019, Jesse Plemons, Dominique Fishback and Ashton Sanders joined the cast of the film, with Algee Smith being cast the following month.

Filming and post-production 
Principal photography began in Cleveland, Ohio on October 21, 2019. On November 25 and 26, 2019, filming took place at the Ohio State Reformatory in Mansfield. After 42 days, production concluded on December 19, 2019. Originally announced as Jesus Was My Homeboy, the film was later reported as being titled Judas and the Black Messiah before being described as untitled. Kristan Sprague began editing the film in January 2020, prior the dozens of studios being shut down due to the COVID-19 pandemic in New York, which later resulted in crew members working remotely during post-production. In July 2020, the film's title was confirmed to be Judas and the Black Messiah.

Music

Two soundtrack albums were released for the film. The first, titled Judas and the Black Messiah (Original Motion Picture Soundtrack), featured incerpts from the film's score composed by Mark Isham and Craig Harris. It was released on February 12, 2021, by WaterTower Music. The same day, another soundtrack consisting of incorporated songs, were released under the title Judas and the Black Messiah: The Inspired Album. The 22-track music album, featured songs from many prominent rappers, such as Jay-Z, ASAP Rocky and Nas, as well as a posthumous appearance by Nipsey Hussle. It features an original song titled "Fight for You" performed by H.E.R., who also co-wrote it with D'Mile and Tiara Thomas. The music album received critical acclaim, and was featured in the 12th position of the Weekly Billboard 200 charts, while also topping the Billboard soundtracks chart, and also listed in 23rd position in the year-ender charts.

Release 
Judas and the Black Messiah had its world premiere at the 2021 Sundance Film Festival on February 1, 2021 at both virtual and in-person screenings. The film was released on February 12, 2021, in the United States, by Warner Bros. Pictures. The film was originally scheduled to be released on August 21, 2020, but because of the COVID-19 pandemic, it was postponed to 2021.

As part of its plans for all of its 2021 films, Warner Bros. Pictures also streamed the film simultaneously on the HBO Max service for a period of one month, after which the film played exclusively in theatres until the start of the normal home media release schedule period. Samba TV reported that 653,000 households streamed the film over its opening weekend. By the end of its first month, the film had been watched in over 1.4 million U.S. households. The film was re-added to HBO Max on July 1, 2021.

Reception

Box office 
Judas and the Black Messiah grossed $5.4 million in the United States and Canada, and $1.4 million in other territories, for a worldwide total of $7 million.

Compared to Land with limited expansion of Willy's Wonderland and The Mauritanian, Judas and the Black Messiah made $2.5 million from 1,888 theaters over its four-day opening weekend, finishing second at the box office behind holdover The Croods: A New Age. About 61% of the audience was African-American and 21% Caucasian, while male/female split evenly and 75% were above the age of 25. In its second weekend the film finished third, dropping 55% to $905,000, then made $500,000 in its third weekend. The weekend following its six Oscar nominations, the film made $250,000 from 951 theaters, for a domestic running total of $5 million.

Critical response 

Review aggregator Rotten Tomatoes reports that 97% of 350 critic reviews were positive, with an average rating of 8.2/10. The website's critics consensus reads: "An electrifying dramatization of historical events, Judas and the Black Messiah is a forceful condemnation of racial injustice – and a major triumph for its director and stars." According to Metacritic, which assigned a weighted average score of 85 out of 100 based on 49 critics, the film received "universal acclaim". Audiences polled by CinemaScore gave the film an average grade of "A" on an A+ to F scale, while 87% of filmgoers at PostTrak gave it a positive score (with an average 4.5 out of 5 stars) and 74% saying they would definitely recommend it.

Writing for Variety, Peter Debruge praised Stanfield's performance and said, "The powerful film puts the current moment into fresh historical context and suggests that ambivalence can be its own form of betrayal." David Rooney of The Hollywood Reporter wrote: "Led by sensational performances from Daniel Kaluuya as Hampton and LaKeith Stanfield as William O'Neal, the FBI informant who infiltrated his inner circle, this is a scalding account of oppression and revolution, coercion and betrayal, rendered more shocking by the undiminished currency of its themes."

Pete Hammond from Deadline Hollywood and Karen Han from Slate both compared various themes in the film to those found in The Trial of the Chicago 7 (released the year before), with Hammond saying that "King skillfully lays out each side of the equation in this raw and exciting account set in 1968". Michael Phillips of the Chicago Tribune gave the film 3.5 out of 4 stars and called the film "a leap and a bound ahead of the recent Netflix production Trial of the Chicago 7" and called it "brash, narratively risky, full of life and sneaky wit (even if the dominant tone is one of foreboding) and brimming with terrific actors."

Former Black Panther Party member Eddie Conway found the portrayal of Hampton in the film inaccurate, noting that he was an outwardly warmhearted person, and not a cold, hardened individual as the film depicts.

Accolades 
Despite being campaigned for leading actor nominations, both LaKeith Stanfield and Daniel Kaluuya were nominated for the Academy Award for Best Supporting Actor. Both of the film's primary actors appearing in the supporting category proved unexpected and confusing to the public and awards pundits. Kyle Buchanan of the New York Times jokingly questioned, "If Stanfield and Kaluuya are both supporting actors, then who exactly is this movie supposed to be about?"

References

External links 

 
 
 Script 
  Shaka King interview on funding Judas and the Black Messiah

2021 films
2021 biographical drama films
2021 crime thriller films
2020s American films
2020s English-language films
2020s political drama films
African-American films
American biographical drama films
American crime thriller films
American political drama films
Biographical films about activists
Bron Studios films
Cultural depictions of J. Edgar Hoover
Films about the Black Panther Party
Films about the Federal Bureau of Investigation
Films featuring a Best Supporting Actor Academy Award-winning performance
Films postponed due to the COVID-19 pandemic
Films scored by Mark Isham
Films set in 1968
Films set in 1969
Films set in Chicago
Films shot in Cleveland
Films shot in Ohio
Films that won the Best Original Song Academy Award
HBO Max films
Participant (company) films
Warner Bros. films